The Girls' 100 metres at the 2017 World Youth Championships in Athletics was held on 12–13 July.

Medalists

Records 
Prior to the competition, the following records were as follows.

Heats 
Qualification rule: first 3 of each heat (Q) and the next 4 fastest qualified.

Semifinals

Final

References 

2017 IAAF World U18 Championships